Thardid Jimbo is a character in Australian Aboriginal mythology.  He was a cannibal giant, ultimately defeated by the resourcefulness of the family of a hunter he had killed.

References
Rose, Carol (2000), Giants, Monsters, and Dragons: An Encyclopedia of Folklore, Legend, and Myth.  New York, W.W. Norton & Co., p. 357.  Available on Google Books.
 Smith, W. Ramsay (1932), Myths and Legends of the Australian Aborigines.  Farrar & Rinehart, New York, reprinted by Dover, 2003, p. 273.  Excerpts available on Google Books.  .

Australian Aboriginal legendary creatures
Giants
Mythological cannibals